In the United States, a donor-advised fund (commonly called a DAF) is a charitable giving vehicle administered by a public charity created to manage charitable donations on behalf of organizations, families, or individuals. To participate in a donor-advised fund, a donating individual or organization opens an account in the fund and deposits cash, securities, or other financial instruments. They surrender ownership of anything they put in the fund, but retain advisory privileges over  how their account is invested, and how it distributes money to charities.

Details
A donor-advised fund is an account at a sponsoring organization, generally a public charity, where an individual can make a charitable gift to enjoy an immediate tax benefit and retain advisory privileges to disburse charitable gifts over time.  The contribution a donor makes to their donor-advised fund is 100% irrevocable and destined for a final 501(c)(3) organization.   Donor-advised funds provide a flexible way for donors to pass money through to charities—an alternative to direct giving or creating a private foundation. Donors enjoy administrative convenience (the sponsoring organization does the paperwork after the initial donation), cost savings (a foundation requires around 2.5% to 4% of its assets each year to run), and tax advantages (versus individual giving) by conducting their grantmaking through the fund.

On average, conversion time for a contribution to a donor-advised fund to a grant from the donor-advised fund, is approximately 24 months.

A donor-advised fund has some disadvantages compared to a private foundation, and some advantages.  Both can accept donations of unusual or illiquid assets (e.g., part ownership of a private company, art, real estate, partnerships or limited partnership shares), but a donor-advised fund has higher deductions for these gifts (depending on the gift). In addition, the founders or board of a private foundation have complete control over where its giving goes within broad legal bounds. In a donor-advised fund, the donor only advises the sponsoring organization where the money should go. While rare (perhaps unheard of?), a sponsoring organization could conceivably ignore the donor's intent. In addition, most donor-advised funds can solely give to IRS certified 501(c)(3) organizations or their foreign equivalents. This rules out, for example, most kinds of donations to individuals, and scholarships—both things a private foundation can do more easily. As well, it precludes political donations, lobbying organizations, etc. 

Donor-advised funds do reap a significant cost advantage (foundations carry a 2.5–4% of assets overhead expense to maintain, a 1–2% excise tax on NET investment earnings and a required 5% spending of assets each year) but may also have one more drawback: a limited lifetime, although this varies depending on the sponsor. American Endowment Foundation for example allows successor advisors in perpetuity. While a foundation can persist for generations or in perpetuity, some sponsoring organizations impose a "sunset" on donor-advised funds, after which they collapse individual funds into their general charity pool.

Because a public charity houses the fund, donors receive the maximum tax deduction available, while avoiding excise taxes and other restrictions imposed on private foundations. Further, donors avoid the cost of establishing and administering a private foundation, including staffing and legal fees. The donor receives the maximum tax deduction at the time they donate to their account, and the organization that administers the fund gains full control over the contribution, granting the donor advisory status. As such, the administrating fund is not legally bound to the donor, but makes grants to other public charities on the donor's recommendation. Most foundations that offer donor-advised funds only make grants from these funds to other public charities, and usually perform due diligence to verify the grantee's tax-exempt status.

Drexel University environmental sociologist Robert Brulle, who has studied networks of nonprofit funding, described donor-advised funds:

In this type of foundation, individuals or other foundations contribute money to the donor directed foundation, and it then makes grants based on the stated preferences of the original contributor. This process ensures that the intent of the contributor is met while also hiding that contributor's identity. Because contributions to a donor directed foundation are not required to be made public, their existence provides a way for individuals or corporations to make anonymous contributions.

Whitney Ball, co-founder and executive director of the donor-advised fund Donors Trust, described donor-advised funds:

A donor-advised fund begins with a donor contributing cash or assets to a public charity, which in turn creates a separate account for the donor, who may recommend disbursements from the fund to other public charities. Technically, the charity that sponsors the fund has final say on the disbursements, and it is legally required to ensure they go only to charitable purposes, but in normal circumstances the original donor's requests will be followed.

Since 2010, some donor-advised funds have become less like traditional foundations. The simultaneous growth of DAFs and online giving has led to funds like CharityBox, that are run by start-up companies through a web/mobile platform. Such companies allow donors to give directly to 501(c)(3) organizations and instantly receive tax-deductible receipts via email.

History
The New York Community Trust pioneered donor-advised funds in 1931, and the second such fund was created in 1935. Since then, commercial sponsors, educational institutions, and independent charities have started offering the service. , donor-advised funds were the fastest growing charitable giving vehicle in the U.S.—more than 269,000 donor-advised accounts held over $78 billion in assets.

Regulation
Current U.S. tax law allows the donor of appreciated securities or other assets to get a tax deduction for the market value of the donation and avoid capital gains taxes.  This double tax advantage can make donating appreciated assets to a charitable organization more attractive than selling the assets and donating cash.  By donating appreciated assets to a donor-advised fund and then advising the fund to make donations to several charities, one can reap these tax advantages without the hassle and paperwork of transferring non-cash assets to several organizations.  This combination of convenience and full tax advantage is one reason that donor-advised funds are used.

While private foundations in the United States are heavily regulated by the Internal Revenue Service, including rules on oversight and minimum annual payouts, donor-advised funds housed in public charities are not subject to the same tax restrictions.

In 1985, National Foundation, Inc. (NFI, now WaterStone), defended its standard for the management of donor-advised funds against the Internal Revenue Service in the United States tax court in National Foundation, Inc. v. United States. The court found that NFI was eligible for tax-exemption and could be classified as a 501(c)(3) non-profit organization based on their management of donor-advised funds. NFI had complete control and ownership of what would later be called donor-advised funds, and could exercise discretion in authorizing charitable distributions of the funds. Donors maintained advisory privileges, but NFI was not obligated to use the funds based on their recommendations, especially if the receiving party did not comply with the five standards of a charitable organization, identified by the court: 1) that it be consistent with the charitable purposes specified in section 501(c)(3); (2) that it have a reasonable budget; (3) that it be adequately funded; (4) that it be staffed by competent and well trained personnel; and (5) that it be capable of effective monitoring and supervision by NFI. The outcome of this case opened the door for many other providers to launch donor-advised fund programs.
On August 17, 2006, President George W. Bush signed the Pension Protection Act of 2006 (H.R. 4) into law, which includes a number of changes to the regulatory framework for donor-advised funds. The Pension Protection Act of 2006 established guidelines for the management of donor-advised funds, using NFI's standards as a framework. The sections dealing with donor-advised funds include:

 Legal definition of a donor-advised fund.
 A list of prohibited payments to donors and advisers to donor-advised fund.
 New rules about what grants can be made from donor-advised funds.
 The documentation required for all contributions to donor-advised funds.

Tax efficiency example
The following example is taken from Vanguard's marketing material for their plan:

Suppose you have 1,000 shares of stock that you purchased 15 years ago (thus, you're in long term capital gains territory). Assume that you purchased the stock for $10 per share and it is now worth $100 per share. Now, let's compare the cost to the donor of making a contribution of $100,000 to a charity of your choice.  We assume a 35% income tax rate and 15% long term capital gains tax rate.

Option 1: Contribute cash from sale of securities
 Immediate cost of donation: $100,000
 Capital gains tax incurred: $13,500 (15% times ($100k minus $10k))
 Net income tax saving: ($21,500) (35% times $100k deduction, minus the capital gains amount)

Charity receives $100,000 for a net cost to donor of $78,500

Option 2: Contribute appreciated securities
 Immediate cost of donation: $100,000
 Income tax saved: ($35,000) (35% times $100k)

Charity receives $100,000 for a net cost to donor of $65,000

Thus, by donating appreciated securities rather than selling them, one can contribute the same total amount with reduced effective donor cost. This is true whether or not one uses a donor-advised fund.

If the securities increase in value after they have been given to the donor-advised fund (but before the grant recommendation is actually made), no additional tax deduction can be claimed by the taxpayer.  On the other hand, if the securities decrease in value, the taxpayer's original tax deduction (based on the value of the securities when given to the donor-advised fund) remains valid.

Even though the tax efficiency is the same, there are differences between giving directly to a charity and giving via a donor-advised fund.

 Some charities are not set up to receive gifts of securities.
 The amount that the donor wants to give to the charity may be an awkward or small number of shares (for example, it could be administratively complicated to give five shares each to 20 charities, but it is easy to give 100 shares to the donor-advised fund and then make 20 separate grant recommendations).
 Giving to a donor-advised fund lets the donor take the tax deduction when it is advantageous. For example, a taxpayer can get a tax deduction for a contribution to a donor-advised fund and decide later which charities are the ultimate beneficiaries.
 Some donor-advised funds process gifts to foreign charities.  Direct gifts to foreign charities by individuals are generally not tax deductible.

However, there is a cost to donor-advised funds.  Most donor-advised funds charge an administrative fee (e.g., 1% per year).  This is in addition to management fees that, for example, any mutual funds the donor fund is invested in.
 The donor-fund administrator may also charge fees for every grant, especially if to a foreign charity.

See also
 Charitable organization
 Donor managed investment account
 Foundation (charity)
 Endowment tax

References

Further reading

External links
 Fidelity Charitable, Giving Report
 National Philanthropic Trust, Donor-Advised Fund Report
 Elfreena Foord, Philanthropy 101: Donor advised Funds
 Analysis of S. 2020 The Tax Relief Act of 2005
 Pension Protection Act of 2006 (H.R. 4)
 Choosing the Right Charitable Vehicle: A Comparison of Private Foundations, Supporting Organizations, and Donor Advised Funds
26 U.S.C. § 4966(d)

Charity in the United States